The Hundred Flowers Awards are, together with the Golden Rooster Awards, the most prestigious film awards honouring the best in Chinese cinema, as well as Hong Kong cinema and the Cinema of Taiwan, they are classified as the Chinese equivalent of the United States Golden Globes. 

The awards were inaugurated by China Film Association in 1962 and sponsored by Popular Cinema magazine, which has the largest circulation in mainland China.

The awards were formerly voted by the readers of Popular Cinema annually. Recent polls allow voters to cast ballots through SMS, the Internet or by phone call. Voting is now no longer confined to readers of Popular Cinema. Award recipients receive a statuette in the shape of a goddess of Flowers.

History
The 2nd Hundred Flowers Awards poll was held in 1963, but the poll was not conducted again until 1980, owing to the Cultural Revolution.  It became an annual event from 1980 until 2004.  Since 2004, the Hundred Flowers Awards ceremonies are held biennially, on alternate years with the Golden Rooster.

In 1992, the Golden Rooster and  the Hundred Flowers Awards were combined into a single national festival.

From 1980 to 2004, the yearly Hundred Flowers poll selects three films with the highest tallied votes as the Best Pictures of the year.  Since 2006, Chinese-language films from Taiwan and Hong Kong are also eligible for awards. Since 2006, films in the past two years are eligible.  The film with the highest number of votes is chosen as best picture, with two runners-up.

New Ballot Rules
Since 2006, China Film Association improves the ballot rules.
The first ballot will result in a list of 8-10 pre-candidate's votes, from the films which box office beyond five million yuan in mainland market, by the 100 cinema managers of China City Film Developing Association  and members of China Film Association.

The second ballot will have the public selecting the five nominations in each category by internet, mobile network, magazine votes and SMS. Each nominee will receive a "Hundred Flowers Awards Nomination Certificate".

The last ballot, a China official notary will randomly select 101 audience members, who voted in the second round and give a dedicated screening for all nominated pictures. Eventually, the 101 audience members will have a secret ballot and subsequently announce the winners.

Other Categories
Best Picture
Best Director
Best Writing
Best Actor
Best Actress
Best Supporting Actor
Best Supporting Actress
Best Newcomer - Since 2006

Irregular categories:
Best Co-produce Film
Best Chinese Opera Film
Best Animation
Best Documentary
Best Cinematography
Best Original Score
Best Art Direction

References

See also
Huabiao Awards

 
Awards established in 1962
1962 establishments in China